Elena Lomakin is a contemporary Russian-American artist. Her main body of work and paintings is influenced by nature and is considered abstract expressionism.

Lomakin was born and raised in Moscow, Russia. She came to the United States at the age of 23 and settled down in San Francisco. She earned her B.A. and M.F.A. degrees in Art History from Moscow's Lomonosov University, attending from 1984 to 1989, while taking numerous art courses in the applied arts of painting and composition. She continued her art studies at the San Francisco Art Institute for two years. Since 2001, she has traveled extensively in Europe, finally returning to California in 2004.

Career
Lomakin lives and works as a full-time artist in San Diego. She has been featured in many exhibitions including the San Diego Art Institute's Museum of the Living Artist Regional Exhibitions and One Foot Exhibitions. Lomakin has been exhibiting since 1992. Her works have appeared in San Francisco, New York City, Chicago, New Haven, San Diego, and outside the United States in the countries of Germany, Russia, Japan, and New Zealand. 

She has received recognition and accolades from the San Diego Watercolor Society, Best in Show Award; the San Diego Art Institute Regional Exhibition & One Foot Exhibitions; the 7th National Juried Exhibition, Ceres Gallery, New York City juried by Cora Rosevear, Associate Curator, Department of Painting and Sculpture for the Museum of Modern Art in New York City.

Influence
Lomakin's work is inspired by nature. It is a unifying theme of her paintings, collages, and art installations. She also stresses the value of simplicity in her work; eschewing theory, she believes that art "can be both empty of meaning and a pleasure to look at”.

See also
Museum of the Living Artist
House of Charm
Balboa Park, San Diego, California

References

External links

Russian emigrants to the United States
Living people
American women painters
21st-century American women artists
Year of birth missing (living people)